The Lumières Award for Best French-Language Film is an award presented annually by the Académie des Lumières since 2003. It rewards the best French language film made outside France each year. It replaced the Lumières Award for Best Foreign Film that was awarded from 1996 to 2002.

Winners and nominees
In the following lists, the titles and names with a blue background are the winners and recipients respectively; those not in bold are the nominees.

2000s

2010s

See also
César Award for Best Foreign Film

External links 
 Lumières Award for Best French-Language Film at AlloCiné

French-Language Film